The 2014 ICC Africa Twenty20 Division Two was an international 20-over cricket tournament held in Benoni, South Africa, from 20 to 24 September 2014. All matches were played at the Willowmoore Park complex.

The tournament, part of the qualification process for the 2016 World Twenty20, was contested by six members of the International Cricket Council (ICC) – two associate members and four affiliate members. The number of participants was reduced by two from the previous tournament in 2012. Of the competing teams, Nigeria had been relegated from 2013 Division One and Swaziland promoted from 2014 Division Three, with the other four qualifying by virtue of their position in the last Division Two tournament. The six teams played each other in a round-robin over a period of five days. Ghana and Zambia finished equal on points, but Ghana had a better net run rate, thus winning the tournament and qualifying for the 2015 Division Two tournament.

Points table

Fixtures

Statistics

Most runs
The top five run-scorers are included in this table, ranked by runs scored and then by batting average.

Source: CricHQ

Most wickets

The top five wicket-takers are listed in this table, ranked by wickets taken and then by bowling average.

Source: CricHQ

See also
 ICC Africa Twenty20 Championship

References 

2016 ICC World Twenty20
International cricket competitions in 2014
2014 in South African cricket
International cricket competitions in South Africa